Missing middle housing describes a range of multi-family or clustered housing types that are compatible in scale with single-family or transitional neighborhoods. Missing middle housing is intended to meet the demand for walkable neighborhoods, respond to changing demographics, and provide housing at different price points. The term "missing middle" is meant to describe housing types that were common in the pre-WWII United States such as duplexes, rowhomes, and courtyard apartments but are now less common and, therefore, "missing". Rather than focusing on the number of units in a structure, missing middle housing emphasizes scale and heights that are appropriate for single-family neighborhoods or transitional neighborhoods. After the introduction of the term in 2010, the concept has been applied in the United States, Canada, and Australia.

Background

The term "missing middle housing" was introduced by architect Daniel Parolek in 2010. Many forms of what is now described as "missing middle" housing were built before the 1940s including two-flats in Chicago, rowhomes in Brooklyn, Baltimore, Washington, D.C., and Philadelphia, two-family homes or "triple-decker" homes in Boston, Worcester, and bungalow courts in California. Post-WWII, housing in the United States trended significantly toward single-family with zoning making it difficult to build walkable medium density housing in many areas and, therefore, reducing the supply of the now "missing" middle.

The resurgence of missing middle housing is due to many factors including resurgent market demand for this type of housing, demand for housing in amenity-rich walkable neighborhoods, the necessity of housing affordability, environmental efforts to support walkability, transit-oriented developments, and changing demographic trends. The American Association for Retired Persons (AARP) released a report showing that more and more, Americans want to "age in place" and need easy access to services and amenities available in walkable, urban, transit-oriented communities. Millennials have been shown to drive less and seek housing choices in walkable neighborhoods close to transit. The number of automobile miles traveled increased each year between 1946 and 2004; today Americans drive less than 2004, and no more per person than in 1996. The decline in driving is most striking among young people aged 16 to 34, who drove 23% fewer miles on average in 2009 than their age group did in 2001. Furthermore, research suggests that millennials prefer amenity-rich, transit rich, and walkable neighborhoods. Small Housing B.C. has stated that "The structure of the traditional North American suburb has failed to live up to the expectations of many who settled in suburban neighborhoods, and new ways are being sought to re-engineer suburban living and re-build those settlement patterns."

Design 

Missing-middle housing comes in a variety of building types and densities but may be characterized by location in a walkable context, lower perceived density, small building footprints, smaller homes, reasonably low amounts of parking, simple construction, and focus on community. Forms of missing middle housing may include side-by-side duplexes, stacked duplexes, bungalow courts, accessory dwelling units (carriage houses, basement apartments, etc.), fourplexes, multiplexes, townhomes, courtyard apartments, and live/work units. These building types typically have a residential unit density in the range of 16 to 30 units per acre but are often perceived as being less dense because they are smaller in scale. Because of its scale, missing middle housing may mix into single-family neighborhoods, act as an end-grain of a single-family housing block, act as a transition between higher density housing and single-family housing, or act as a transition from a mixed-use area to a single-family area. The resulting density may support broader community desires, including walkable retail, amenities, public transportation, and increased "feet on the street".

Barriers

Many local governments do not allow the zoning necessary to build MMH.  Owning a studio, 1 bedroom, or 2 bedroom condominium that is 600-1,000ft2 in a multi-unit complex with a reasonable HOA monthly fee and a 1.5 detached garage isn't allowed in many areas because of zoning ordinances.  Many 5-over-1 complexes were built starting in the 2010s but primarily for leasing and not owning.

Impacts 

Missing middle housing offers a greater choice in housing types that still blend into existing single-family neighborhoods, create more affordable housing options, and help reach sustainability goals. Missing middle housing units are usually smaller units than single-family homes because they share a lot with other homes, which results in lower per-unit land costs and, therefore, lower housing costs. Missing middle housing types are also one of the cheapest forms of housing to produce because they are typically low-rise, low parking and wood-frame construction, which avoids expensive concrete podiums. Because the construction and building materials are comparatively less complicated than larger mid-and high-rise structures, a larger pool of small-scale and local home builders can participate in the creation of this form of housing. To support municipal budgets, the denser and more efficient use of land and infrastructure may be financially productive for municipalities with more people paying taxes per acre for less infrastructure than large lot single-family homes.

Increasing missing middle housing options may allow families of different sizes, types, and incomes to access quality housing. Missing middle housing tends to become naturally affordable housing as it ages, and provides a level of density that supports the shops, restaurants, and transit that are associated with walkable neighborhoods. Walkable neighborhoods may then support sustainability, health, and affordability goals by reducing reliance on personal vehicles. This would promote active transportation, reduce sprawl, reduce pollution, and reduce transportation costs by lessening the need for personal vehicles.  Missing middle housing options may allow seniors to downsize without leaving their neighborhood. For example, accessory dwelling units can enable multi-generation households to have privacy while all living on the same property.  Missing middle housing may enable a wider range of families to achieve homeownership by offering a wider range of housing options and prices. Additionally, missing middle housing types such as accessory dwelling units can support mortgages through the rents of those secondary units. Overall, missing middle housing options can create housing at a wide range of prices for a range of family types.

Some property rights advocates believe that widely permitting missing middle housing expands property rights by allowing property owners more choice in how to use their property. Some equity advocates feel that permitting more diverse housing choices, such as missing middle housing, may reduce historic and modern inequities that keep less affluent people out of certain amenity-rich neighborhoods.

State-level examples 

Several American states have adopted or proposed legislation aimed at increasing the stock of missing middle housing. Most notably, Oregon adopted House Bill 2001 in 2019. The bill requires Oregon's medium-sized cities to allow duplexes on each lot or parcel zoned for residential use that allows for the development of single-family homes. Additionally, Oregon's large cities (with a population over 25,000) and cities in the Portland Metro region, must allow duplexes, triplexes, quadplexes, cottage clusters, and townhouses in residential areas. The Bill set aside funds for planning assistance to local governments to help draft local codes and allows municipalities to set reasonable design and infrastructure standards. In Massachusetts, H.5250 was adopted to require municipalities near the MTBA to reasonably allow duplex or multi-family housing near transit stations. The Bill also created financial incentives for communities to zone for "smart growth" and made it easier for municipalities to adopt zoning ordinances or zoning amendments. In 2019, Washington State adopted E2SHB 1923 encouraging all cities under the Growth Management Act (GMA) to increase residential capacity by supporting many forms of missing middle housing. The State of Washington provided grant funds to help support code changes, housing action plans, and sub-area plans to support missing middle housing types. In 2022 Maine adopted bills LD2003 and LD201 that implement several affordable housing strategies including allowing accessory dwelling units and duplexes on residential lots statewide and permitting fourplexes in certain "growth areas".

The states of Vermont, New Hampshire, and California have adopted a number of bills that promote accessory dwelling units and reduce regulatory barriers to accessory dwelling unit construction. State-level action has also occurred in Australia where, citing an effort to promote more 'missing middle' development, New South Wales launched the Low Rise Housing Diversity Code and Design Guides for Low Rise Housing Diversity. The State of Connecticut House and Senate approved legislation to reduce some zoning restrictions on missing middle housing types such as accessory dwelling units.

Other states have considered but not adopted similar legislation to support missing middle housing types. The State of Illinois considered HB4869 which would have required municipalities to permit (and reasonably regulate) accessory dwelling units. Virginia considered HB 152 which would have required municipalities to allow (and reasonably regulate) missing middle housing types (duplexes, cottages, etc.) on all lots currently zoned for single-family housing. The State of Maryland considered HB1406 "Planning for Modest Homes Act of 2020" which would have required census tracts that are affluent, transit-adjacent, and/or near a large number of jobs, to allow missing middle housing types. Nebraska considered LB794 would mandate every city with more than 5,000 people to allow missing middle housing in areas previously zoned exclusively for single-family detached residential. Montana considered HB 134 which would have allowed duplex, triplex, and fourplex housing in certain municipalities. North Carolina considered House Bill 401 and Senate Bill 349, which would have allowed middle housing in any neighborhood zoned for detached, single-family homes.

Municipal examples 

Many municipalities are updating their land-use and zoning regulations to better support missing middle housing. Changes to land use regulations to support missing middle housing may also include changes such as form-based-codes, transit-oriented development, and other updates.

In the United States, Portland, Oregon, has a number of historic missing middle housing types located throughout the city, most of which are duplexes, that were built before the 1920s before the city's first zoning plan was approved. Zoning for single-family homes was expanded in the 1950s and the building of duplexes or triplexes largely became illegal in Portland. In the 2010s Portland began updating its zoning regulations to permit Missing Middle Housing types. Missing Middle zoning updates have spread through the Pacific Northwest and now include Seattle, Walla Walla, Lake Stevens, Orting, Wenatchee, Eugene, Olympia, Spokane, and Bellingham, Tacoma, and Tigard among others.

Zoning updates to support missing middle housing are not just found in the Pacific Northwest. Notably, In Minnesota, the Minneapolis 2040 plan called for up-zoning the city to allow more missing middle housing types throughout the city. The new zoning in Minneapolis does not prohibit the construction of single-family homes, but no neighborhoods in the city are zoned exclusively for single-family zoning. The city also eliminated mandatory parking minimums from its zoning regulations allowing builders and business owners to choose the amount of parking they provide based on the market and their unique needs.

In California, Sacramento voted to permit up to four housing units on all residential lots and reduce parking requirements in order to help the city alleviate its housing crisis and to achieve equity goals. The City of Berkeley, California has voted unanimously to zone for several missing middle housing types city-wide by 2022 citing equity and housing affordability as goals.

Bryan, Texas implemented a pattern-zoning policy in which the City provides several pre-designed and pre-approved plans for missing middle housing types (with significantly reduced permitting procedures) in the "midtown" portion of the city. The goal of the program is to reduce housing costs caused by design fees and lengthy permitting procedures, reduce burdens on city staff, achieve public input and support for housing designs in advance, and ensure quality housing designs. Norfolk, VA also has a missing middle pattern book with free designs for missing middle housing types including duplexes and  quadplexes.

Many local governments across the United States have chosen to zone for missing middle housing types in significant portions of their zoning districts including Grand Rapids Michigan, Durham, North Carolina, Kirkland Washington's cottage housing zoning, Montgomery County, Maryland's numerous housing studies, Bloomington, Indiana, and Dekalb County, Georgia. Indianapolis, Indiana chose to permit missing middle housing types (in addition to higher density housing types) along bus rapid transit corridors. Indianapolis also included missing middle housing types in its residential infill guidelines. Other cities are making long-term plans to increase the supply of missing middle housing. Charlotte, NC added language in their comprehensive plan to allow duplexes and triplexes across the city. Citing missing middle housing as a component of a larger affordable housing strategy, Raleigh, NC voted to permit several missing middle housing types in most residential zones. 

While some communities have not adopted regulations to widely permit the full range of missing middle housing types, they have made changes to permit accessory dwelling units. Diverse examples include large cities such as Los Angeles, CA, the City of Chicago, IL, and smaller cities such as Lexington, KY, and Santa Cruz, CA.

Outside of the United States, cities in both Australia and Canada have adopted missing middle housing reforms. Notable examples in Canada include Edmonton, Alberta's missing middle zoning reforms, and Vancouver British Columbia's secondary unit zoning. Montréal, Québec is notable for its distinct architecture and urban planning that has historically included significant amounts of missing middle housing. Due to its unique history, many neighborhoods in Montreal include low-rise attached duplexes, triplexes, and apartments often with exterior stair-entry, minimal front setbacks, and with small backyards. This creates a significant level of density without high-rises. In Australia, The 30-Year Plan for Greater Adelaide includes a focus on missing middle housing as does Moreland's Medium Density Housing Review.

See also 
Bicycle-friendly
Form-based code
New Urbanism
Streetcar suburb
Traditional neighborhood development
Urban sprawl
starter home
Sustainable city
Green building
Affordable housing
Duplex
Zoning codes
Stacked triplex

References

Urban design
Urban studies and planning terminology
Real estate in the United States
Zoning
New Urbanism